Óvári is the Hungarian name of Oar village in Vetiș commune, Satu Mare County, Romania.

Óvári may also refer to:

Hungarian toponymic surname meaning "someone from Óvár":
Zsolt Óvári
Éva Óvári
Óvári Jakab

Hungarian-language surnames